Young Knives are an English indie rock band from Ashby-de-la-Zouch, Leicestershire. The name is based on a misunderstanding of "young knaves", which was found by the band when rummaging through a book.

The band was originally named Simple Pastoral Existence, but this name only lasted until they split for a few years from 1997 to 1999, at which time they renamed themselves Ponyclub. The name "Ponyclub" was changed when they got their first record deal because there was already an artist in existence named "Pony Club". This is when the name "The Young Knives" was coined. They later dropped the definite article prefix prior to the release of their second full-length album, Superabundance.

They broke into the music industry in 2002 with the critical success of their debut mini-album The Young Knives... Are Dead, but began to garner national coverage upon the release of their single "The Decision" in late 2005. They played their biggest live gig in June 2006 and completed a UK tour in support of their first proper album Voices of Animals and Men, which reached No. 21 in the UK Album Charts. In July 2007 they were nominated for the Nationwide Mercury Prize. Their second album Superabundance entered the charts in March 2008 at number 28, with a third album Ornaments From The Silver Arcade ready for April 2011.

The band released their fourth album, the more experimental Sick Octave, via their official website on 21 April 2013. A Kickstarter campaign was also launched by the band on this date, with a £10,000 crowdsourcing target being set. The album was released on 4 November 2013. After a hiatus of around 4 years, Young Knives returned as a duo consisting of the Dartnall brothers, released a new single "Red Cherries" in 2019, and released their fifth album Barbarians in September 2020.

Band members
 Henry Dartnall – vocals, guitar
 Thomas Bonsu-Dartnall (also known by his stage name "The House of Lords") – vocals, bass guitar, keyboards

Past members
 Oliver Askew – drums, backing vocals (1998–2015)

Career
Formed in the north Leicestershire market town of Ashby-de-la-Zouch under the name 'Simple Pastoral Existence', the Young Knives began their career "playing bad funk and Ned's Atomic Dustbin covers", but it was their subsequent move to Oxford that saw their career begin to take off. After changing their name from 'Ponyclub', their big break came in 2002 with a successful set at the Truck Festival, which was followed by the release of ... Are Dead on local label Shifty Disco. The band also won "Road to V", a competition for bands to open the second stage at Virgin Music Festival, beating a large number of bands to win.

After some years playing successful support slots to bands such as The Futureheads and Hot Hot Heat in Oxford and surrounding areas, the band were signed to Transgressive Records, and an EP, Junky Music Make My Heart Beat Faster, was a sell-out success. Their debut single "The Decision", produced by Andy Gill of Gang of Four (a noted influence on the band), was released in December 2005, and was followed in February 2006 by "Here Comes The Rumour Mill". The latter was their first chart success, reaching No. 36 in the UK charts and receiving significant airplay on MTV2 and other video channels.

The band completed a lengthy UK tour in early 2006, and supported Dirty Pretty Things and The Rakes later in the same year, fitting in an appearance at SXSW in Texas and a terrestrial television debut on Later with Jools Holland in June. In July that year, the band made their second appearance at Truck, and released two more top 40 singles, "She's Attracted To" and "Weekends and Bleak Days (Hot Summer)", before the release of Voices of Animals and Men in August. A re-issue of "The Decision" was released on 30 October, the same day the band played what Henry described onstage as their "biggest gig ever", at the London Astoria.

In 2008, the band released their second album, Superabundance, recorded in Scotland. This spawned the single "Terra Firma" released on Transgressive Records at the end of 2007, and "Up All Night", despite Razorlight having an album and song of the same title. In July 2007, the band's former label Shifty Disco released The Young Knives ...Are Dead ...And Some, a compilation of the tracks from ...Are Dead and its follow-up EP Rollerskater. The album is an enhanced CD, which enables owners to access the rare music video for "Walking on the Autobahn".

In 2008, the Young Knives went to Asia for the first time, headlining the inaugural edition of the multimedia arts and music festival Clockenflap in Hong Kong. In March 2009, they played a 2-date China tour courtesy of Split Works. The Young Knives toured the UK extensively 'off the beaten tracks' throughout March 2008, as well as playing three dates as part of the NME Brats gigs. They also returned to their home town of Ashby-de-la-Zouch to play a one-off concert at the Ashby Venture Theatre on 6 May 2008. Also, notably the band supported Kaiser Chiefs at their homecoming gig at the Elland Road stadium, alongside Kate Nash, Friendly Fires and The Enemy, as well as playing in the Mercury Lounge in the Lower East Side in New York City.

Young Knives released "Turn Tail" and new B-sides on 19 May 2008. They were the first band since the 1970s to record from their first take straight to vinyl, and on that vinyl, there was a 'special' acoustic version of "Turn Tail", recorded at Westbourne Studios, Westbourne Park London.

Young Knives' third album Ornaments from the Silver Arcade was released on 4 April 2011 on Gadzook, Young Knives' own label. They released three singles from the album: "Love My Name", "Human Again" and "Vision in Rags", and toured the album extensively in 2011.

For Young Knives' fourth album, the band chose to work independent of a label, crowd-funding the recording through Kickstarter. On their Kickstarter page, they wrote that they were pleased with "being able to make whatever record we want"; they also wrote that "doing our record through Kickstarter means that we can afford to hire in a wicked mixer (David Wrench, who did that Caribou record and Is Tropical and a whole host of cool records) but also get as crazy as we want on the record". The album was released on 4 November 2013, followed by a UK tour.

Discography

Studio albums

Mini album
The Young Knives ...Are Dead (2002)

Compilations
The Young Knives ...Are Dead ...And Some (2007)

EPs
 2003 Rollerskater EP
 2004 Split EP (a collaboration with Smilex)
 2005 Junky Music Make My Heart Beat Faster
 2013 Oh Happiness
 2015 Something Awful (Record Store Day exclusive)

Singles

References

External links
Official Website

English art rock groups
English indie rock groups
Musical groups from Oxford
Musical groups established in 1998
British musical trios
Musical groups from Leicester
Transgressive Records artists